Route 617 is a  long mostly east–west secondary highway in the eastern portion of New Brunswick, Canada.

The route starts at Route 620 in Hamtown Corner where it travels east to Birdton. From here, the route turns south and passes Little Forks, Jones Forks, and MacLeans Settlement before ending in Burtts Corner at Route 104.

History

See also

References

617
617